Let It Be Me is a 1995 musical film starring Campbell Scott, Jennifer Beals, Yancy Butler, Leslie Caron, James Goodwin and Patrick Stewart. It was written, produced and directed by Eleanor Bergstein. It was released by Savoy Pictures.

Plot
After becoming engaged to Emily, Gabe finds himself watching a graceful pair of dancers in a dance studio window. Hoping to learn to dance for his upcoming wedding, Gabe enters the studio to take lessons. While interested in his dance teacher, he finds that he is still looking forward to his wedding, but things change when he has Emily come in for her lessons.

Cast
 Campbell Scott as Dr. Gabriel Rodman
 Jennifer Beals as Emily Taylor
 Yancy Butler as Corrine
 Patrick Stewart as John
 James Goodwin as Bud
 Leslie Caron as Marguerite

Production

Writing

Filming

Soundtrack

Let It Be Me is a soundtrack album for the 1995 film of the same name.

Reception

Critical response

Box office

Awards and nominations

Home media

References

External links

1995 films
American romantic musical films
Savoy Pictures films
1990s romantic musical films
1990s English-language films
1990s American films